Weragama is a village in Sri Lanka, located within Sabaragamuwa Province.

Weragama Walauwa belongs to the descendants of William Harold Weragama and Amitha Katugaha in Ratnapura Sri Lanka. The village was a gift from the king for the services by the family. The mansion still stands in the village.

See also
List of settlements in Sabaragamuwa Province

External links

Populated places in Sabaragamuwa Province